15 Temmuz Kızılay Millî İrade, formerly known and still commonly referred to as just Kızılay, is an underground station and a hub of the Ankara Metro. A total of three lines meet at Kızılay, with a fourth line under construction; Ankaray, the M1, and the M2, while the M4 will be extended southeast from Atatürk Kültür Merkezi. The station was first opened on 30 August 1996 with the Ankaray platform, while the M1 platform was opened on 29 December 1997.

Kızılay station is largest rapid transit complex on the Ankara Metro system.

History

While the Ankara Metro system was planned in the early 1990s, Kızılay station was chosen to be the transfer station between the original two line. The station was first opened on 30 August 1996 as part of the 11-station Ankaray line, which is the second-oldest rapid transit line in Turkey. 16 months later, the M1 platform was opened on 29 December 1997. Kızılay remained the only hub and transfer station on the Ankara Metro until 12 February 2014, when the M3 line entered service from Batıkent. A month later, on 13 March, the M2 line from Kızılay to Koru entered service, making Kızılay one of two metro stations in Turkey serving more than two lines, along with Yenikapı Transfer Center in Istanbul. Following the failed 2016 coup d'état, the station, along with the square, was renamed 15 Temmuz Kızılay Millî İrade.

References

External links
EGO Ankara - Official website
Ankaray - Official website

Railway stations opened in 1996
Ankara metro stations
1996 establishments in Turkey
Transit centers in Ankara